The Cessna CR-1 was a short-lived air racer that was part of the CR series of Cessna racers.

Design and development
The Cessna CR-1 was built using $1200 in winnings from the Cessna GC-1.

The aircraft was a mid-wing open cockpit taildragger using a fabric covered wooden wing structure. The landing gear was manually retractable into the fuselage.

Operational history
The aircraft was tested by Eldon Cessna. The one and only flight required a 100 mph launch speed, and 130 mph approach speed to keep the aircraft controllable.

Variants
After the sole test flight, the CR-1 was grounded and redesigned as the Cessna CR-2.

Specifications (Cessna CR-1)

See also

References

Racing aircraft
CR-01
1930s United States sport aircraft
Single-engined tractor aircraft
Mid-wing aircraft
Retractable conventional landing gear